Nishiyama Onsen Keiunkan (西山温泉慶雲館) is an onsen—a Japanese hot spring spa—in the Yamanashi Prefecture. Founded in 705 by Fujiwara Mahito, it is a prime example of shinise ("long-established business") and perhaps the oldest independent company in operation following the acquisition of construction company Kongō Gumi in 2006. 

In 2011, the Keiunkan was recognized by Guinness World Records as the oldest hotel in the world despite the hotel facilities on site being only a few decades old.

History 
Keiunkan lies at the foot of the Akaishi Mountains. Since its foundation, the spa has had all its hot water sourced directly from the local Hakuho Springs. The onsen was created by Fujiwara Mahito, son of an aide to the 38th Emperor of Japan, Emperor Tenji. The springs gained popularity and attracted bathers from various parts of Japan. The onsen's guests included Takeda Shingen, Tokugawa Ieyasu, and current Emperor of Japan, Naruhito.

The onsen was continually developed over its millennium of existence, with rudimentary pools in caves being replaced with more finished baths in wood huts, which were themselves replaced and refined iteratively over centuries. Keiunkan underwent its most drastic transformation in 1997 when dedicated lodging were created and the business became a ryokan offering private rooms with funtons and half board. In 2005, private, free-flowing hot spring baths were added to every room.

Until 2017, it was continuously operated by 52 generations of the same family (including adopted heirs) for over 1,300 years. In 2017, Keiunkan’s president, Kenjiro Kawano, who was unrelated to the owner and thus unable to inherit Yushima, the holding company, created Nishiyama Onsen Keiunkan Limited, and ownership of Keiunkan was transfered and Yushima dissolved.

Description 
The hotel has 37 rooms, a kaiseki restaurant, and a moon-viewing platform. As of 2019, all rooms and facilities of the hotel have password free Wi-Fi. Tatami mats and classic art furnish the rooms. The staff wear  (two piece) kimono. The hot baths' machinery pumps 1,000 liters of naturally heated water per minute and there are plans to double that capacity.

See also
Three Ancient Springs
List of oldest companies for several hundred notably old companies.

References

External links
Official website in English
Photos of Nishiyama Onsen Keiunkan

Hotels in Yamanashi Prefecture
8th-century establishments in Japan
Companies established in the 8th century
Buildings and structures completed in 705
Guinness World Records
Ryokan